The men's 200 metre freestyle competition of the swimming events at the 1991 Pan American Games took place on 12 August. The last Pan American Games champion was John Witchel of US.

This race consisted of four lengths of the pool, all in freestyle.

Results
All times are in minutes and seconds.

Heats

Final 
The final was held on August 12.

References

Swimming at the 1991 Pan American Games